Eidmannella is a genus of scaffold web spiders first described by Carl Friedrich Roewer in 1935.

Species
, it contains eight species:

Eidmannella bullata Gertsch, 1984
Eidmannella delicata Gertsch, 1984
Eidmannella nasuta Gertsch, 1984
Eidmannella pachona Gertsch, 1984
Eidmannella pallida (Emerton, 1875)
Eidmannella reclusa Gertsch, 1984
Eidmannella rostrata Gertsch, 1984
Eidmannella tuckeri Cokendolpher & Reddell, 2001

References

Nesticidae
Araneomorphae genera
Spiders of North America
Cosmopolitan spiders
Taxa named by Carl Friedrich Roewer